Blue Collar TV is an American sketch comedy television series that aired on The WB from July 29, 2004 to July 26, 2006 starring Jeff Foxworthy, Bill Engvall, and Larry the Cable Guy. The show's humor dealt principally with contemporary American society, and especially hillbilly, redneck, and Southern stereotypes. The show was greenlighted on the heels of the success of the Blue Collar Comedy Tour, which the series' three lead actors toured with in the early to mid-2000s. It was created by Fax Bahr and Adam Small, in addition to J.P. Williams and Jeff Foxworthy. Blue collar is a U.S. phrase used to describe manual laborers, as opposed to white collar for office or professional workers.

Overview
Unlike most sketch comedy programs, each episode of Blue Collar TV was generally centered on a theme, which Foxworthy revealed at the start of each episode. Themes included "Food", "Kids", and "Stupidity", among others, with Foxworthy generally performing a short comedic monologue based on the theme. Most sketches in each episode featured at least one of the three Blue Collar Comedy Tour veterans in an acting role (including almost all from the first season), but the second season saw more sketches featuring the six other cast members exclusively.

Recurring sketches
 "Bad Jobs for Take Your Daughter to Work Day": This sketch features Foxworthy, Engvall, or Larry the Cable Guy at a job with their "daughter" tagging along. Their job is always something that would make Take Your Daughter-To Work Day awkward, such as a NASCAR driver or a newscaster.
 "Big Kids": Foxworthy, Engvall and Larry the Cable Guy play Ronnie, Blake, and Dooley, three toddlers who constantly misbehave and annoy their parents, usually from the back seat of their car.
 "Bill the Bad Storyteller": Bill Engvall tries to tell a story to his friends, but he is unable to tell it very well. In most cases, the story starts off interesting or creepy, but the conclusion is very plain and boring.
 "Dan Grogan": Grogan (Foxworthy) is the spokesman and owner of Dan Grogan's House of Gravy and Gravy Spa. Grogan's company also makes and sells Pre-Chewed Food and Ranch Cleanser. Grogan's restaurants and spas are well known for their "Gravy Bombs" (balloons filled with brown gravy) and appearances by "Sergeant Gravy (Engvall) and Davey the Gravy Dog".
 "Dinner with...": After a short skit featuring a character saying who he would not want to be invited over for dinner, the scenario is shown featuring a typical family, with that very person over for dinner. The dinner guests have included Hank Williams Jr., Joe Rogan, and Jeff Jarrett.
 "Fat Family": Engvall, Brooke Dillman, and Ayda Field play a family of morbidly obese people, though they are proud of their physical state and do not like skinny people or the thought of losing weight. Their appearances usually revolve around normal sitcom happenings, though modified to suit their happiness of their weight.
 "Martha Stewart's Tips from the Inside": Martha Stewart (Dillman) gives household hints from jail, each hint inspired by her prison experiences.
 "The Martin Bros.": Casey, Jack, and Dale Martin (Foxworthy, Engvall, and Larry the Cable Guy), are three unruly brothers who drink all the time, play jokes on people, and never take anything seriously. They were first seen hosting the show "Hick Eye for the Queer Guy", and later opened a party planning company.
 "On the Red Carpet with Dee and Engle Barry": Dee and Engle (Foxworthy and Larry the Cable Guy) interview big names in country music at the Country Music Awards red carpet pre-show.
 "Politically Correct Fairy Tales": Larry the Cable Guy reads fairy tales that are now politically correct from his niece's (or nephew's) fairy tale book ("Snow Caucasian and the Seven Handy Capable Little Persons", for example) to the children. He is not impressed with the stories in their new state, and usually stops before the story is finished (except for "The Tortoise and the Hare in the Non-Competitive Fun Run") to explain "how it really ends", which usually involves him going into the story, and abruptly ending it (for example, in "Vertically-Challenged Native American Riding Hood and the Endangered Wolf", he ends the story by saying "I go in there, I shoot the wolf, send Grandma to an old folks home, get Little Red Riding Hood out of that hood, and shack up and eat wolf steaks."). Other "Politically Correct Fairy Tales" that have been told by Larry the Cable Guy include:
 "Jack and the Organic Beanstalk" (formerly known as Jack and the Beanstalk).
 "'Twas The Night Before A Non-Denominational Winter Holiday" (formerly known as 'Twas the Night Before Christmas).
 "A Child's Guide to Health and Wellness" (formerly known as Hansel and Gretel).
 "The Redneck Dictionary": On each episode, an entry in "The Redneck Dictionary" is shown, where cast members take common words and morph them into perceived redneck speech. An example would be "artichoke" (I "artichoke" the feller who told me to order this). The only recurring sketch used in every episode, it is based on an element of Jeff Foxworthy's stand-up act. "The Redneck Dictionary" itself is jokingly published by Hatfield-McCoy, a parody of Merriam-Webster.
 "Redneck Yard of the Week": Each week, Foxworthy and Ayda Field present a Redneck Yard of the Week, as submitted by home viewers to http://www.redneckyard.com. The presentation is done like an awards ceremony, with Foxworthy providing commentary on the winning yard after the yard is shown.
 "Rescue 911!": A parody of the television show of the same name, hosted by Jim Farnsworth (Foxworthy). Each episode inexplicably revolves around the Parker family, after Tom (Oldring) gets devastating injuries caused inadvertently by his Grandma, followed by Dad (Larry) calling 911, and the EMTs arriving, where Jim Mayweather (Williams) suffers similar injuries, and Don Clinton (Engvall) saves the day.
 "Tell Me That Don't Stink": Here, Foxworthy has the female cast members (Heath and an audience member also played once each) smell a substance that does not smell very pleasant at all. Smelled items include doe-in-heat urine and valerian root.
 "The Deck": Four friends sit on a deck and tell deck stories, with the humor coming from double entendres involving the similarities between the words "deck" and "dick". The first sketch featured guest star Drew Carey.
 "The Tacketts": A dysfunctional redneck family in a sitcom-like environment. Each episode involves a conflict, usually involving the bickering father and mother (Jeff and Brooke), though each episode ends happily. Also features Larry, Bill, and Ashley as the other members of the family.
 "CSI": based on the television show CSI, it talks about crimes that take place, for example, in the Greensboro Tri-County Area, finds evidence of the crime and finds the criminal.
 "The What Burns Me Booth": A testimonial booth where various people say what burns them up.
 "White Trash Days of Our Lives": A spoof of Days of Our Lives, which Ayda Field co-stars in. Follows the formula of a soap opera, except with redneck characters.
 "Who's the Fool": A game show featuring two contestants listening to humorous stories from Engvall, Foxworthy, and Larry the Cable Guy, then deciding whether or not the story is true.
 Though not technically a recurring sketch, many episodes feature a parody of a television show or film, only featuring Larry the Cable Guy as the star. Such examples have included "The Real Bachelor" (a parody of The Bachelor), "Larry the Spider Guy" (a parody of Spider-Man), and "Handicops" (a parody of COPS).
 "Totes TV": A skit featuring Brooke, Ashley, Ayda and Bill playing women hosting a talk show television show with a sorority background. The girls act out of excitement and talk incoherently whenever they have a celebrity guest on.

Cast

Main
Note: Due to the show's relatively short life, no cast members were added or removed during the show's run.
 Jeff Foxworthy
 Larry the Cable Guy
 Bill Engvall
 Brooke Dillman
 Ashley Drane
 Ayda Field
 Heath Hyche
 Peter Oldring
 Gary Anthony Williams
 Scott Miller and the Commonwealth, the house band

Guest appearances
Blue Collar TV had many guest stars during its short run. Sometimes, it was a musical guest that performed at the end of the episode. In most cases, the musical guest also takes part in at least one sketch.

Guests have included:

 Abyss
 Trace Adkins
 Big & Rich
 Clint Black
 Jeremy Borash
 Brooks & Dunn
 Drew Carey
 Deana Carter
 Ronny Cox
 Diana DeGarmo
 Jeff Dunham and Walter
 Fredi Gonzalez, manager for the Atlanta Braves
 Jeff Jarrett
 Christopher Knight
 Adam LaRoche, first baseman for the Atlanta Braves
 Rascal Flatts
 Montgomery Gentry
 Lonestar
 Sterling Marlin
 David Lee Murphy
 Terry Pendleton, hitting coach for the Atlanta Braves
 Billy Redden
 LeAnn Rimes
 Brad Pitt
 Trick Pony
 Mark Richt, head coach of the University of Georgia Bulldogs football team 
 John Smoltz, pitcher for the Atlanta Braves
 Heath Slater
 A. J. Styles
 Travis Tritt
 Leon White
 Michael Waltrip
 The Warren Brothers
 Jimmy Wayne
 Don West
 Ron White
 The Georgia Gym Dogs, the University of Georgia's  NCAA champion gymnastics team
 Van Zant

Production
Fellow Blue Collar Comedy Tour costar Ron White declined to star on Blue Collar TV due to a fear of being typecast as "blue collar". However, he guest-starred on many episodes of the show. On his 2006 comedy album, You Can't Fix Stupid, White jokingly cited his own lack of work ethic as a reason for not participating more on the show.

The show originated from the Alliance Theatre in Atlanta. Later episodes of season 1 and all episodes of season 2 were taped at the Classic Center in Athens, Georgia, although the show taped at the House of Blues in New Orleans during a two-episode road trip in 2004. Later episodes were recorded during their Blue Collar tour.

The show halted production a few weeks into the 2005 fall season. It was also removed from the lineups of both Comedy Central and the WB. No official statement was given by the WB, though Engvall and Larry the Cable Guy both confirmed the end of Blue Collar TV on their websites.

Blue Collar TV returned on May 31, 2006, to finish airing its second season throughout the summer as filler for the final weeks of the WB, which would shut down later that year. The show did not move to The CW. In summer 2006, Foxworthy started his own show, Foxworthy's Big Night Out, which aired on Country Music Television and retained some aspects of the Blue Collar TV format. It was canceled after one season. The show aired in reruns on Comedy Central's sister network CMT for a time in the early 2010s. In Canada the series aired on The Comedy Network (Now CTV Comedy Channel), CTV, BiteTV (Now Makeful), and CMT.

In 2022, reruns began airing on Circle, a country music and lifestyle-focused digital multicast channel partially owned by Opry Entertainment Group.

Episodes

Series overview

Season 1 (2004–2005)

Season 2 (2005–2006)

Home media

External links
 

Comedy Central original programming
The WB original programming
2004 American television series debuts
2006 American television series endings
2000s American sketch comedy television series
Television series by Warner Bros. Television Studios
English-language television shows